Erik Engsmyr (15 April 1929 – 14 March 2012) was a Norwegian footballer. He played in two matches for the Norway national football team from 1956 to 1960.

References

External links
 
 

1929 births
2012 deaths
Norwegian footballers
Norway international footballers
People from Sarpsborg
Association football midfielders